The 2010 UCLA Bruins football team represented the University of California, Los Angeles (UCLA) in the 2010 NCAA Division I FBS football season.  Coached by third-year head coach Rick Neuheisel, they opened the season on the road against the Kansas State Wildcats on September 4, 2010. The next three games were against ranked opponents, and after a road win at #7 (AP) Texas, expectations for the Bruins dampened by their 0–2 start began to rise again. However, the season turned for the worse and included two three-game losing streaks against Pac-10 opponents, the latter to end the season on a three-game skid. The Bruins, coming off a bowl win the year before, found themselves ineligible for bowl play with their 4–8 overall record and finished ninth in the Pac-10.

Player injuries and other attrition depleted UCLA of its roster depth, while true freshmen were forced into action and seniors who were previously reserves became starters; a quarterback who had attempted only 17 passes in his career became the starter.

Recruitment
The first Wednesday in February was the start of signing day in college football, February 3, 2010 – April 1, 2010. For midyear junior college transfer, the period was December 16, 2009 to January 15, 2010.

UCLA's recruits:

Spring practice
Week one – April 1 (4:00 p.m.), April 2 (4:00 p.m.) and April 3 (12:00 noon)
Week two – April 6 (4:00 p.m.), April 8 (4:00 p.m.), April 9 (4:00 p.m.) and April 11 (11:00 a.m.)
Week three – April 12 (4:00 p.m.), April 13 (4:00 p.m.), April 15 (4:00 p.m.) and April 16 (4:00 p.m.)
Week four – April 19 (4:00 p.m.), April 20 (4:00 p.m.), April 22 (2:30 p.m.)
Spring game – April 24, 7 p.m., Rose Bowl

Pre-season practice

 
Monday, August 9 – 3:00-6:00 p.m.
Tuesday, August 10 – 10:00 am-1:00 p.m.
Wednesday, August 11 – 3:00-6:00 p.m.
Thursday, August 12 – 10:00 am-1:00 p.m.
Friday, August 13 – 4:00-6:00 pm (First day of full pads)
Saturday, August 14 – 9:00-11:00 a.m. and 4:00-6:00 p.m.
Sunday, August 15 -3:00-5:15 p.m.
 
Monday, August 16 – 9:00-11:00 a.m. and 4:00-6:00 p.m.
Tuesday, August 17 -3:00-5:15 p.m.
Wednesday, August 18 – 9:00-11:00 a.m. and 4:00-6:00 p.m.
Thursday, August 19 – 3:00-5:15 p.m.
Friday, August 20 – 9:00-11:00 a.m. and 4:00-6:00 p.m.
Saturday, August 21 – 5:00 p.m. (Scrimmage at Drake Stadium)

Notes
 Quarterback Kevin Prince has changed his uniform number to No. 4 to match Brett Favre's number.
 23 UCLA alums on the pre-season rosters of 15 National Football League teams: Jacksonville Jaguars – LB Kyle Bosworth, RB Maurice Jones-Drew and TE Marcedes Lewis; Washington Redskins – WR/KR Terrence Austin, S Chris Horton and TE Logan Paulsen.

Key players

Schedule

Game summaries

Kansas State

Last year, the Bruins defeated the Wildcats 23-9 at the Rose Bowl.

1st quarter scoring: KSU – Daniel Thomas 1 yd. run (A. Cantele kick).

2nd quarter scoring: UCLA – Kevin Prince 11 yd. run (Kai Forbath kick); Kai Forbath 44 yd. field goal.

3rd quarter scoring: KSU – William Powell 28 yd. run (Cantele, A. kick);  UCLA – Kai Forbath 35 yd. field goal; KSU – A. Cantele 35 yd. field goal.

4th quarter scoring: UCLA – Kai Forbath 42 yd. field goal; KSU – Brodrick Smith  5 yd. pass from Coffman; KSU – Carson (A. Cantele kick); UCLA – Ricky Marvray 29 yd. pass from Prince; UCLA – Kevin Prince (Kevin Prince pass failed); KSU – Daniel Thomas 35 yd. run (A. Cantele kick).

Stanford

This game was the first time the Cardinal defeated the Bruins at the Rose Bowl since 1996.  This was the first shutout UCLA had suffered in the twenty-first century, since a 17–0 loss to California on October 16, 1999.  This was the first time Stanford had achieved a road shutout against an opponent since 1974.  This was the first time since 1941 that Stanford shutout UCLA.

Houston

UCLA upset No. 23 ranked Houston in front of the home crowd in the Rose Bowl. Matt Hogan kicked a 29-yard field goal to give the Cougars the first quarter lead. Johnathan Franklin answered with an 11-yard run for a Bruins 7-3 lead. The Bruins scored two touchdowns in the second quarter. Kevin Prince ran for a 2-yard touchdown and Franklin added a 1-yard run touchdown.

In the third quarter, UCLA had a 42-yard field goal by Kai Forbath, the 2009 Lou Groza Collegiate Place-Kicker Award winner, and a touchdown again by Franklin (12 yards).
Houston scored twice in the fourth quarter, on James Cleveland's 10-yard pass from quarterback Terrance Broadway and on Matt Hogan's 31-yard field goal. There were seven turnovers, including interceptions by UCLA's Rahim Moore and Akeem Ayers.

Two Houston quarterbacks, Case Keenum and Cotton Turner, were injured in the game and are out for the season.

Patrick Larimore, who had a career-high and team-high 11 tackles (10 solos), including three for loss, forced a fumble and broke up a pass in the game was named Pac-10 Conference defensive player of the week. He was also named the FWAA/Bronko Nagurski National Defensive Player of the Week.

Texas

Thirteen years after beating Texas on "Rout 66", the Bruins upended the No. 7 ranked Longhorns 34-12 with touchdowns by Johnathan Franklin and Kevin Prince in front of a stadium-record crowd of 101,437 in Austin, Texas. Franklin scored an 11-yard touchdown on his 118-yard day, while Prince had two touchdowns, a 38-yard run and a 1-yard pass to Ricky Marvray. Kai Forbath kicked two field goals, 39 and 49 yards, and missed one for the Bruins. The final touchdown was made by UCLA's Derrick Coleman on a 29-yard run.

Justin Tucker kicked two field goals, 31 and 34 yards, and James Kirkendoll scored on a 5-yard pass from Garrett Gilbert for Texas. Now the Bruins have beaten two teams from the State of Texas in consecutive weeks. The Longhorns turned the ball over to the Bruins five times during the contest.

Washington State

The Bruins came from behind to score the final three touchdowns, one by quarterback Richard Brehaut (1-yard run) and two by running back Derrick Coleman (1 and 4-yard runs) to defeat the Cougars at home.

Quarterback Brehaut played in place of injured Kevin Prince and made 12 of 23 passes for 128 yards in his first career start. Coleman had a banner game, scoring three rush touchdowns and a 73-yard long run in the fourth quarter. Franklin accounted for 216 of UCLA's 437 rushing yards, his first. Kicker Kai Forbath now has kicked 80 field goals, including the 33-yard and 20-yard field goals in this game.

Winning with 565 total offense yards, UCLA has a 38-18-1 record on Washington State.

California

Cal has a record of 8-6 coming off a bye week in Jeff Tedford's years at Cal and the Bears have beaten UCLA five consecutive times at home.

Oregon

Arizona

Oregon State

The Bruins snapped a three-game losing streak with a 51-yard field goal by Kai Forbath with one second left in the game to give UCLA a 17-14 victory over the visiting Beavers. With 1:17 left in the game, Forbath missed a 46-yard field goal, which went wide left. Originally, the field officials had ruled that UCLA had no time left, but the challenge gave the Bruins one more second left to set up the field goal try.

Richard Brehaut scored for UCLA in the first quarter with a seven-yard run and Joe Halahuni did the same for Oregon State with a 28-yard pass from Ryan Katz.

In the third quarter, Markus Wheaton ran for 22-yard touchdown for the Beavers lead and Johnathan Franklin scored from the 1-yard line for a Bruins touchdown to tie the game.

Washington

Arizona State

Arizona State quarterback Brock Osweiler threw 4 touchdown passes while UCLA quarterback Richard Brehaut had three. The defeat ended UCLA's hope of a bowl game in December.

USC

Jonathan Franklin ran for 109 yards and one touchdown in a loss to USC. The Bruins ended the season losing six of their last seven games.
 
Before kickoff, fans of both teams were involved in a fight which eventually led to two participants being stabbed. Violence occurred outside Rose Bowl in 2008 as well, when nearly 50 were arrested.

Awards and honors
September 20 – UCLA linebacker Patrick Larimore, who had a career-high and team-high 11 tackles (10 solos), including three for loss, forced a fumble and broke up a pass in the upset of No. 23 Houston on September 18 was named the FWAA/Bronko Nagurski National Defensive Player of the Week and Pacific-10 Conference Defensive Player of the Week.
September 27 – Center Ryan Taylor and linebacker Sean Westgate were named Pac-10 Players of the Week. Akeem Ayers named Lott IMPACT Player of the Week. The team was named the Tostitos Fiesta Bowl National Team of the Week for games of the weekend of Sept. 25.
 Nine Bruins received All-Pacific-10 honors: First team – Junior safety Rahim Moore and junior linebacker Akeem Ayers; Second team – Senior place kicker Kai Forbath, sophomore running back Johnathan Franklin and sophomore punter Jeff Locke ; Honorable mention – Junior running back/special teams performer Derrick Coleman, junior safety Tony Dye, senior center Ryan Taylor and junior linebacker Sean Westgate.
December 9, 2010 – Linebacker Akeem Ayers was named to the Walter Camp Football Foundation second-team All-America.

All-America teams
 Linebacker Akeem Ayers and safety Rahim Moore, Associated Press, third-team
 Punter Jeff Locke and Akeem Ayers, Sports Illustrated, honorable mention
 Akeem Ayers, Phil Steele's Magazine, second-team
 Long-snapper Christian Yount and Rahim Moore, Steele's, fourth-team All-America
 Free safety Rahim Moore, Sporting News magazine, first-team

Coaches

Rick Neuheisel – Head coach
Chuck Bullough – Def. coordinator
Norm Chow – Offensive coordinator
Frank Gansz, Jr. – Special teams
Todd Howard – Defensive line
Tim Hundley – Secondary
 Clark Lea – Linebackers
Reggie Moore – Wide receivers
Wayne Moses – Running backs
Bob Palcic – Offensive line
Philip Rauscher – Graduate assistant/Offense
Daronte Jones – Graduate assistant/Defense

References

Bibliography

 UCLA Bruins football media guide 2010 Edition (preseason information)

UCLA
UCLA Bruins football seasons
UCLA Bruins football